The following is the qualification system and qualified gymnasts for the Gymnastics at the 2019 Pan American Games competition to be held in Lima, Peru.

Qualification timeline

Qualification summary
*In Artistic Gymnastics, NOCs with 5 entered gymnasts may also enter the team competition.

Artistic
The top eight teams in each event qualified five gymnasts each. Teams 9-13 each qualified two gymnasts each. A further seven spots were available (per gender) for individual qualification (with a maximum of one quota per gender per nation).

Men

Women

Rhythmic
The top six nations in the individual event at the Pan American Championship qualified two gymnasts. The last four spots went to the top four nations in the individual event, that have not earned any quotas (each with one gymnast). The top six nations in the group event also qualified, with each group consisting of 5 gymnasts. If the host nation has not qualified, the organizing committee will need to provide an additional quota for the country to compete.

Individual

Group

Trampoline
The top three countries, defined by the top two results of the individual event at the Pan American Championship qualified two gymnasts in each respective event. The last six spots in each event went to the top six nations in the individual event, that have not earned any quotas. The host nation Peru is guaranteed a quota if it does not qualify and would take the place of the 12th place ranked athlete.

Men
Peru did not finish in the top 12 spots, and its best placed athlete was awarded the final slot.

Women
Only 8 nations competed in the qualification tournament, which meant the fourth placed nation received an extra quota spot.

References

P
Qualification for the 2019 Pan American Games
Gymnastics at the 2019 Pan American Games